Lymphocyte expansion molecule (LEXM) is a protein discovered in 2015, found to be involved in immune responses (in mice) to some cancers and viruses. The protein was found to be responsible for an increased production of T cells in mice. The protein may be relevant to humans and could be a target for drug discovery.

Scientists at Imperial College are developing a gene therapy based on this protein.

References

Mouse proteins